William and Susan Savage House, also known as Savage-Combs House, is a historic home located near Leggett, Edgecombe County, North Carolina. It was built about 1815, and is a -story, five bay, double pile, Federal style frame dwelling.  It has a brick-pier foundation, a side gable roof, and gable-end exterior chimneys.  The house was restored in the 1990s.

It was listed on the National Register of Historic Places in 2014.

References

Houses on the National Register of Historic Places in North Carolina
Federal architecture in North Carolina
Houses completed in 1815
Houses in Edgecombe County, North Carolina
National Register of Historic Places in Edgecombe County, North Carolina